Darko Kostić ((Ntarko Rallis); born 30 September 1978) is a Serbian–Greek professional basketball coach and former player.

Playing career 
Rallis had two stints with the Belgian team Okapi Aalstar where played during 1998–99 and 2000–01 season. In between he played for the German team Ratiopharm Ulm. In 2003, he moved to Slovakia where he played for two seasons for Chemosvit Svit and MBK Lučenec. Also, he played for the Ecuadorian team Salesianos Club Guayaquil.

On 2 November 2011 Rallis signed for Doxa Lefkadas of the Greek A2 League. He also played for the Greek A2 League teams Ermis Lagkada, and Livadeia.

Coaching career 
Prior to the 2016–17 season Kostić was named as a head coach of OKK Beograd after one year he spent there as an assistant coach of the head coach Vlade Đurović. He left the club in June 2018. 

On 30 July 2018 Kostić became a head coach for Bulgarian team Academic Bultex 99. On 27 December 2018 Academic parted ways with him following the loss against Beroe.

On 4 January 2019, Kostić was named as a head coach of Vršac of the Basketball League of Serbia. In February 2020, he left Vršac.

On 16 June 2020, Kostić became a head coach for Novi Pazar.

References

External links 
 Darko Kostić biogafija
 Coach Profile at eurobasket.com
 Darko Kostic Player Profile at eurobasket.com
 Darko Rallis Player Profile at eurobasket.com
 Coach Profile at realgm.com
 Profile at proballers.com
 Twitter Profile
 Instagram Profile

1978 births
Living people
BK Iskra Svit players
BKK Radnički players
BKM Lučenec players
Doxa Lefkadas B.C. players
Greek expatriate basketball people in Serbia
Greek basketball coaches
Greek men's basketball players
Greek people of Serbian descent
KK Crvena zvezda youth players
KK Smederevo players
KK Vršac coaches
KK Kolubara coaches
Livadeia B.C. players
Okapi Aalstar players
OKK Beograd coaches
OKK Novi Pazar coaches
Naturalized citizens of Greece
Point guards
Ratiopharm Ulm players
Serbian expatriate basketball people in Bulgaria
Serbian expatriate basketball people in Belgium
Serbian expatriate basketball people in Ecuador
Serbian expatriate basketball people in Greece
Serbian expatriate basketball people in Germany
Serbian expatriate basketball people in Slovakia
Serbian men's basketball coaches
Serbian men's basketball players
Sportspeople from Smederevo